Christian Marrero (born July 30, 1986) is an American professional baseball coach for the Pittsburgh Pirates of Major League Baseball (MLB).

Marrero played in Minor League Baseball for 12 seasons for the Pirates, Chicago White Sox, Atlanta Braves, and Philadelphia Phillies organizations. He served as the hitting coach for the Williamsport Crosscutters in 2018 and the Lakewood Blueclaws in 2019. The Pirates hired him as their major league assistant hitting coach before the 2021 season.

His brother, Chris, played in MLB.

References

External links

Living people
1986 births
Altoona Curve players
Indianapolis Indians players
Birmingham Barons players
Bravos de Margarita players
Gigantes del Cibao players
Great Falls White Sox players
Gwinnett Braves players
Kannapolis Intimidators players
Lehigh Valley IronPigs players
Mississippi Braves players
Reading Fightin Phils players
Somerset Patriots players
Tiburones de La Guaira players
Tigres de Quintana Roo players
Tigres del Licey players
Winston-Salem Dash players
American expatriate baseball players in the Dominican Republic
American expatriate baseball players in Mexico
American expatriate baseball players in Venezuela